Ádám Farkas may refer to:

 Ádám Farkas (poet) (1730–1786), Lutheran priest and poet
  (born 1968), economist and financial executive 
 Ádám Farkas (footballer) (born 1987), Hungarian footballer